José de Cuero y Caicedo was a bishop and politician who served as President of Ecuador, Vice President of Sovereign Board of Quito, Bishop of Roman Catholic Archdiocese of Quito, and Roman Catholic Archdiocese of Cuenca.

Personal life 
He was born in 11 September 1735 in Cali, Colombia to Fernando Cuero y Pérez and Bernabela Caicedo y Jiménez. He received a Doctorate of Philosophy in 1762 and title of Lawyer in June 20, 1768. He died in 10 December 1815 in Lima, Peru. In September 12, 2016, his remains were buried with high military honors.

References

1735 births
1815 deaths
18th-century Roman Catholic bishops in Ecuador
Roman Catholic bishops of Quito
Roman Catholic bishops of Cuenca
History of Quito